Baori  is a panchayat village in the state of Rajasthan, India,  Baori is the headquarters town for Bawadi tehsil of Jodhpur District in Rajasthan. Baori is the only village in the gram panchayat.

Etymology
The town is named after the step-well there, known as a bawari or baori.

Geography
The town lies alongside National Highway 62, and is 40 km by road north of the city of Jodhpur

Demographics 
In the 2001 census, the town of Baori had 10,212 inhabitants, with 5,419 males (53.1%) and 4,793 females (46.9%), for a gender ratio of 884 females per thousand males.

Notes

External links 
 

Villages in Jodhpur district